Upendra Madhav is an Indian film screenwriter, director and dialogue writer known for his works in Telugu cinema. He is known for his works in box office hits such as Baadshah, Dookudu, Aagadu and Bruce Lee - The Fighter.

Selected filmography

Career 

He came to the Telugu film industry wanting to become a director. He worked with Priyadarshini Ram as an assistant director for Manodu and Toss and directed some corporate films and films for the government. He would get a chance to join the direction department of big budget films but one thing led to another and he became a screenwriter including writing for Dookudu as associate writer which led to further screenwriting. His debut as a feature film director was the 2018 film MLA.

As a director

As a writer

Website and Blog

References

External links
 

1978 births
Telugu people
Indian male screenwriters
Living people
People from Guntur
Screenwriters from Andhra Pradesh
Telugu screenwriters